Graphium rileyi, the Riley's graphium or blotched lady , is a butterfly in the family Papilionidae (swallowtails). It is found in Ivory Coast and central Ghana. Its habitat consists of semi-deciduous and upland forests.

Taxonomy
Graphium rileyi belongs to a species group with 16 members. All are very similar
The species group members are:
Graphium abri Smith & Vane-Wright, 2001 
Graphium adamastor  (Boisduval, 1836) 
Graphium agamedes (Westwood, 1842)
Graphium almansor (Honrath, 1884)
Graphium auriger (Butler, 1876) 
Graphium aurivilliusi (Seeldrayers, 1896)
Graphium fulleri  (Grose-Smith, 1883)
Graphium hachei (Dewitz, 1881)
Graphium kigoma Carcasson, 1964
Graphium olbrechtsi Berger, 1950
Graphium poggianus (Honrath, 1884)
Graphium rileyi Berger, 1950
Graphium schubotzi (Schultze, 1913)
Graphium simoni (Aurivillius, 1899),
Graphium ucalegon  (Hewitson, 1865)[
Graphium ucalegonides (Staudinger, 1884)

References

rileyi
Butterflies described in 1950
Butterflies of Africa